The 2018 Exeter City Council election took place on 3 May 2018 to elect a third (13/39) of the members of Exeter City Council in England. This was on the same day as other local elections. The election result left the council with the same political make up as it had before the election, with Labour in control with 29 seats and the Conservatives as the main opposition party, returning with 8.

Background
At the previous election in 2016 election, Labour remained in control of the council with 30 councillors out of 39. In February 2017, Labour Councillor Chris Musgrave defected to the Green Party, leaving them with 29 seats going into the election.

Results summary

Council composition

After the previous election, the composition of the council was:

Before this election, the composition of the council was:

After this election, the composition of the council was:

Results by ward
(*) Asterisk denotes the sitting councillor.

Alphington

Duryard & St.James

Exwick

Heavitree

Mincinglake & Whipton

Newtown & St.Leonards

Pennsylvania

Pinhoe

Priory

St Davids

St Loyes

St Thomas

Topsham

References

External links 
Exeter City Council

2018 English local elections
2018
2010s in Exeter